Vice Admiral Priyantha Perera, RSP and Bar, USP is a Sri Lankan senior naval officer. He is the incumbent Commander of the Navy of the Sri Lanka Navy.

Naval career
Educated at Royal College, Colombo, Perera joined the Si Lanka Navy in the executive branch in 1987 as an Officer Cadet of the 5th intake of the General Sir John Kotelawala Defence University. He was commissioned a Sub Lieutenant in 1989 following his training at the General Sir John Kotalawala Defence University and Naval and Maritime Academy, Trincomalee. He completed the Sub Lieutenant Technical Course at Naval and Maritime Academy in 1992 and specialized in Clearance Diving from the Indian Naval Diving Training School in 1994. He holds a Masters in Science Degree (Defence Studies) in Management from General Sir John Kotalawala Defence University and a Master’s Degree of Maritime Policy with Distinctions from University of Wollongong. He is a graduate of the US Naval War College, having passed the US Naval Staff Course in 2004 and the Defence and Strategic Studies Course at People's Liberation Army National Defence University in 2018. He become the Commander of the Sri Lanka Navy on 18th December 2022, after being elevated him to the rank of three-star Admiral.

Honors 
His decorations include Rana Sura Padakkama thrice for gallantry; Uttama Seva Padakkama for meritorious service. Other medals he has gained over the years include, the Sri Lanka Armed Services Long Service Medal, the Sri Lanka Navy 50th Anniversary Medal, the Sewabhimani Padakkama, the Sewa Padakkama, the 50th Independence Anniversary Commemoration Medal, the Eastern Humanitarian Operations Medal, the Northern Humanitarian Operations Medal, the North and East Operations Medal, the Purna Bhumi Padakkama, and the Riviresa Campaign Services Medal.

His badges include: the Fast Attack Craft (FAC) Squadron Pin, the Surface Warfare Badge Commendation Badge, Commendation Badge and the Qualified in Command and Staff Course Badge.

Private life
He is married to Commander Mala Lamahewa and they have two sons.

References

Living people
Sinhalese military personnel
Year of birth missing (living people)
Alumni of Royal College, Colombo
Naval and Maritime Academy graduates
University of Wollongong alumni
Commanders of the Navy (Sri Lanka)
Sri Lankan vice admirals